Darryl McDonald (born 1958) is an American technology executive.

Life
Darryl McDonald has a Bachelor of Arts in economics and business administration from University of Georgia.  He served on University of Georgia’s Board of Advisors for Terry College of Business.

McDonald joined NCR Corporation in 1982.  From 1997 to 2003, he was vice president, Americas retail industry for the Teradata division of NCR.  McDonald was vice president for consulting services for the Teradata division from 2003 to 2007.
In 2007 he became the chief marketing officer of Teradata, and in 2010 executive vice president for applications marketing and business development.
His estimated compensation in 2010 was over $2 million.  
McDonald announced the Teradata acquisition of Aster Data in 2011.
In December 2012 he became executive vice president of applications.
In 2015 he became chief strategy officer of Teradata, although he was no longer listed as a corporate officer.
 
McDonald sits on the senior advisory board for the Teradata University Network, is a Partners Steering Committee member for Teradata's national conference, and maintained the company blog, Vision 2.0.
He left Teradata in 2016.

McDonald wrote articles,  and spoke at conferences on the socialization of data, the data used in online social networks.

References

Corporate executives
Living people
Teradata
NCR Corporation people
1948 births
Terry College of Business alumni